Isacia conceptionis, the Cabinza grunt, is a species of grunt native to the Pacific Coast of South America and Nicaragua. It is important to local commercial fisheries. I. conceptionis is the only known member of its genus.

References

Haemulinae
Monotypic fish genera